Frankie Neil (July 25, 1883 – March 6, 1970) was a World Bantamweight champion.  Fighting at 114 1/2 pounds, he took the world title from reigning champion Harry Forbes on August 13, 1903, at the Mechanics Pavilion in San Francisco in a second-round knockout of a match scheduled for twenty rounds.  Eddie Graney was the referee.  Neil held the title only a little over a year, losing it on October 17, 1904, to British boxing champion Joe Bowker.

Neil later was reputed to have lost much of his boxing fortune at the horse track and from investing in race horses.  He worked for Standard Oil in his retirement from boxing.

Early career
Not long before his first attempt at the bantamweight championship, on April 11, 1902, Neil fought a grueling fifteen-round draw against Eddie Hanlon, who was only seventeen at the time.  The lengthy bout was considered an epic one, and both boxers later remarked to the Oakland Tribune that they were completely exhausted after the bout. Their close bout in Oakland, California, was marked by Neil's skills at fighting from a distance, as the Tribune noting Neil's defensive skills wrote, "At long range Neil was by far the cleverer of the two and he landed repeatedly on Hanlon...." Neil's scientific boxing skills were noted in the battle when the Tribune wrote, though Hanlon appeared the stronger, more aggressive boxer, "Neil had the cleaner punch and landed as often as Hanlon, but did not have the force to his blows."

Neil first tried for the bantamweight title against Harry Forbes on December 23, 1902, but lost in a seventh-round TKO in Oakland, California.  In a wind up to the title between November 1900 and March 1902, Neal won an impressive seven of eight bouts in the San Francisco area by early knockout or technical knockout.  During the two year windup, he fought against such competent boxers as George White, George Margarini, Tommy Dixon, and Kid Malone.

World Bantamweight champion
Neil took the world title from reigning champion Harry Forbes on August 13, 1903, at the Mechanics Pavilion in San Francisco in a second-round knockout of a match scheduled for twenty rounds.  According to the St. Paul Globe, the winning blow was a hard left to the stomach of Forbes.  Forbes had been a two to one betting favorite prior to the bout due to his standing as reigning champion, though many boxing fans still backed Neil to win. In the brief two rounds of boxing, Forbes had been down three times, probably surprising many in the audience.

According to at least the World Boxing Association, Neil lost the World Bantamweight title on October 17, 1904, to British boxer Joe Bowker at the National Sporting Club in London in an historic twenty round points decision.  As globally recognized boxing associations with the ability to sanction titles were in their infancy in 1904, some dispute as to when Neil lost his title may exist in news articles of the period.

Neil took the American Bantamweight Title from Harry Tenny on July 28, 1905, in a twenty-five round bout at the Colma Club in Colma, California. Six months later, on February 28, 1906, he knocked out Tenny in the fourteenth round at the Mechanics Pavilion in San Francisco, a frequent venue for Neil. According to the San Francisco Examiner, Neil had won from "start to finish". Tragically, Tenny died the following day of injuries sustained during or aggravated by the bout.  Neil claimed years later in an interview that he was never able to hit with the same ferocity after hearing of the death of Tenny.

Attempt at Featherweight title
On July 4, 1906, Neil would move up a class and take a shot at the World Featherweight Championship against the exceptional reigning champion Abe Attell, who had held the title since 1902, but would retain it for an additional six years. He lost the 20 round bout in a points decision at the Naud Junction Pavilion in Los Angeles.  The length of the fight may have been a result of Neil's skills as a boxer, or Attell's desire to stretch the bout feeling well matched with Neil. Of their 1906 meeting, the Los Angeles Herald wrote in pre-fight publicity that "The bout will be one of the greatest ever held in Los Angeles, and will attract attention from all over the world, in as much as a world championship is at stake and the battlers are rated as among the cleverest boxers in the ring." The Herald also noted "Neil is more of a fighter than a boxer" and it is "seldom that any featherweight has shown the brand of a punch possessed by Neil."  Neil may have been considered a clever scientific boxer by some, but these skills, in the opinion of most boxing historians, were far surpassed by those of Attell. In December 1906, Neil wrote an article for the Oakland Tribune noting that he was robbed by the referee in the decision against him in his July 4 bout with Attell in Los Angeles, and that he had given Attell, the "worst licking of his career." It is questionable if most of the boxing fans present would have agreed with Neil.

Neil would lose to Attell again at Dreamland Rink in San Francisco on January 31, 1908, in a thirteenth of twenty-round TKO.  Years later, in an interview in 1961, Attell claimed he had been motivated to beat Neil as a result of anti-semitic remarks he had heard Neil, whom he had known since childhood, make during the fight.

Boxing decline, 1907

In his ill-advised comeback to the ring on November 22, 1907, Neil lost badly to the accomplished boxer Owen Moran at the Dreamland Rink in San Francisco.  As noted by The San Francisco Call, of his eight-month hiatus from boxing, "it is this letup which is the factor that is hard to estimate in figuring upon his chances." Though sometimes taking on top talent, such as Young Brit, and Monte Attell, Neil lost 13 of 21 of his better publicized bouts after his loss to Moran.

Neil would then lose to the great lightweight boxer Ad Wolgast in Milwaukee, Wisconsin, in a ten-round points decision on May 6, 1908.

Last Bantam title shot
On June 19, 1909, Neil would unsuccessfully attempt to retake the then vacant World Bantamweight Title from Monte Attell, brother of Abe, but lose in an eighteen of twenty-round knockout in Colma, California. Monte Attell would take the title and hold it for several years.  According to the Oakland Tribune, Attell won every round. Neil was knocked out by a full left under the chin in the eighteenth round,  but was markedly tired by the fifteenth.  According to the Tribune, Attell was observed to be chewing gum in the eighth round, a tactic used by his featherweight championship brother Abe. The Tribune wrote that Neil was not the boxer of the caliber he had been a few years previously, though Attell was a boxer of exceptional skill.

Later life and death
Neil was working for Standard Oil in Richmond, California by June 1926, and had lived in Richmond since the early 1920s. In 1926, he would on occasion referee boxing matches at El Cerito, and Richmond, California.  He had previously lost his boxing fortune from investing in a large stable of race horses and from his personal losses from betting on the races.

He died on March 6, 1970, at 86, in Richmond, California after an illness of several months, and was buried three days later at Mt. Olivet Cemetery in the South San Francisco suburb of Colma.  Neil had been working as a janitor at a local Post Office in his later years, living at Point Richmond.

Professional boxing record
All information in this section is derived from BoxRec, unless otherwise stated.

Official record

All newspaper decisions are officially regarded as “no decision” bouts and are not counted to the win/loss/draw column.

See also
List of bantamweight boxing champions

References

External links
 
 Frankie Neil - CBZ Profile

|-

|-

Boxers from San Francisco
World bantamweight boxing champions
1883 births
American male boxers
1970 deaths
Bantamweight boxers